Mauritania national basketball team is the national basketball team in Mauritania. They have appeared in the FIBA Africa Championship and are yet to make an appearance in the FIBA World Championship.

Its best performance was at the FIBA Africa Championship 1985 in Ivory Coast, where Mauritania finished 6th, ahead of favored teams such as Nigeria and Tunisia.

Current roster
At the AfroBasket 2013 qualification: (last publicized squad, incomplete) 

|}

| valign="top" |

Head coach

Assistant coaches

Legend

Club – describes lastclub before the tournament
Age – describes ageon 1 July 2012
|}

Competitive record

Summer Olympics
Yet to qualify

World championships
Yet to qualify

FIBA Africa Championship

African Games

Yet to qualify

See also
 Mauritania national under-19 basketball team

References

External links
Official website Mauritania Basketball Federation
Mauritania Basketball at afrobasket.com

 
Men's national basketball teams
1964 establishments in Mauritania